Adam Buck (1759–1833) was an Irish neo-classical portraitist and miniature painter and engraver (as was his brother Frederick) principally active in London.

Life
Buck was born in Castle Street, Cork. Becoming an accomplished miniaturist in the 1780s while still in Ireland, he made a permanent move to London in 1795 – his residences there included 174 Piccadilly (1795–8), Frith Street, Soho (1799–1802) and Bentinck Street (1813–20). His patrons included Angelica Catalani (an opera singer), JP Kemble, Sir Francis Burdett, Thomas Hope, George IV, the duke of York and his mistress Mary Anne Clarke. A major influence on Regency culture (producing plates of contemporary costume as well as genre pictures of family and classical scenes and illustrations for Laurence Sterne's Sentimental Journey), he was himself much influenced by the Greek Revival (the furniture, vases - which he collected -, sculptures, costumes and even hairstyles in his works are all ancient Greek). He also acted as a painting teacher, as well as exhibiting more than 170 miniatures and small full-length portraits at the Royal Academy between 1795 and 1833. He died at 15 Upper Seymour Street, London.

Works 
Proposals for publishing by subscription 100 engravings from paintings on Greek vases which have never been published, drawn and etched by Adam Buck from private collections now in England, dedicated to the earl of Carlisle (1811) – intended as a continuation of Sir William Hamilton's Collection of Engravings from Ancient Vases … (1791–7)

References

External links
Portrait of a woman and child by Buck
 Portraits of the Miss Sneyds, 1790

1759 births
1833 deaths
18th-century Irish painters
19th-century Irish painters
Irish male painters
Irish portrait painters
Irish engravers
People from Cork (city)
Neoclassical painters
Portrait miniaturists
Irish emigrants to Great Britain
19th-century Irish male artists